Arbour Hill Prison is a prison located in the Arbour Hill area near Heuston Station in the centre of Dublin, Ireland. The prison is the national centre for male sex offenders.

Adjacent to the prison are the Church of the Sacred Heart, the official church of the Irish Defence Forces, and its cemetery, containing a memorial and burial place of 14 executed leaders of the 1916 Easter Rising.

Architecture
The prison was designed by Sir Joshua Jebb and Frederick Clarendon and opened on its present site in 1848, to house military prisoners. The church has an unusual entrance porch with stairs leading to twin galleries for visitors in the nave and transept. Another unusual feature is the Celtic round tower which erupts from a rectangular base. It opened as a civilian prison in 1975.

The adjoining Church of the Sacred Heart, which is the prison chapel for Arbour Hill prison, is maintained by the Department of Defence. At the rear of the church lies the old cemetery, where lie the remains of British military personnel who died in the Dublin area in the 19th and early 20th century.

An interesting feature is the tunnel which runs from St Bricans Military Hospital, via the Prison to the former Collins Barracks.

A doorway beside the 1916 memorial gives access to the Irish United Nations Veterans' Association house and memorial garden.

Inmates
Notable former inmates include Ray Burke TD and former Irish Times journalist Tom Humphries.

On April 19, 1940, Irish Republican Jack McNeela died in Arbor Hill Prison after 55 days on hunger strike. McNella had been arrested and jailed for operating a pro republican pirate radio station.

1916 leaders

The military cemetery behind this prison is the burial place of 14 of the executed leaders of the 1916 Easter Rising.  The leaders were executed in Kilmainham Gaol and their bodies were transported to Arbour Hill for burial. The 14 buried in Arbour Hill are:

 Patrick Pearse
 Tom Clarke
 Thomas MacDonagh
 Joseph Plunkett
 Éamonn Ceannt
 Seán Mac Diarmada
 James Connolly
 Ned Daly
 Willie Pearse
 Michael O'Hanrahan
 John MacBride
 Michael Mallin
 Con Colbert
 Seán Heuston

The graves are located under a low mound on a terrace of Wicklow granite in what was once the old prison yard. The grave site is surrounded by a limestone wall on which the names are inscribed in Irish and English. On the prison wall opposite the grave site is a plaque with the names of other people who were killed in 1916.

Location

The prison is located on Arbour Hill at the rear of the National Museum of Ireland at Collins Barracks, Dublin 7. The area is also the site of the Arbour Hill Military Barracks.

Bus Route(s): Nos. 37, 39 , 70 from city centre.

See also

 Prisons in Ireland

References

External links
Arbour Hill Prison

Buildings and structures in Dublin (city)
Prisons in the Republic of Ireland